Daiquiri Factory: Cocaine Raps, Vol. 2 is the sixth album released by rapper, Andre Nickatina. It was released on June 6, 2000 for Million Dollar Dream and was produced by Nick Peace, Fillmoe Coleman and Nicolo Vennarucci. The album was also a sequel to Nickatina's original Cocaine Raps.

Track listing
"Bakin' Soda in Minnesota" - 3:03  
"Daiquiri Factory" - 2:51  
"Rumppa Bum Bum" - 0:33  
"Nickatina Says" - 3:21  
"Gingerbread Man" - 2:37  
"King Nicky's Crown" (Ft. Lolo Swift) - 2:54  
"Ghost of Fillmoe" - 0:35  
"The Al Capone Suite" (Ft. Equipto) - 3:39  
"Birds with No Wings" - 2:36  
"Cherry Colored Benz" [Filmoe Coleman Band Instrumental] - 1:30  
"Alphabet Soup" (Ft. Lolo Swift) - 3:42  
"Fears of a Coke Lord" - 2:13  
"Bobby Shaw Is My Tiga" - 0:49  
"Little Coco" - 4:01  
"Awake Like an Owl" - 3:33  
"Last Rap I'll Ever Write" - 3:30
"Bonus Track" [Performed by Lolo Swift] - 4:23

2000 albums
Andre Nickatina albums